The apple tree is a plant species known for its fruit, the apple.

Apple tree, Appletree and similar may also refer to:

Places
Appletree Cove, a bay in Washington, USA
Appletree Eyot, an island in the River Thames in England

Music
AppleTree, an indie rock band from Bogotá, Colombia
Apple Tree (album), a 1996 EP by Applejaxx
"Apple Tree", a song by Australian band Wolfmother from their self-titled debut album
"Apple Tree", a song by Aurora from A Different Kind of Human (Step 2)
"Apple Trees", a song by Faun Fables from Early Song
"Apple Trees", a song by Eels from End Times
"Appletree" (song), a 1998 song by Erykah Badu
 The Apple Tree, a 1966 Broadway musical

Other uses
Apple Tree (horse), a French Thoroughbred racehorse
Apple Trees (film), a 1992 German film
The Apple Tree (anthology), a 1952 book by Daphne du Maurier
"The Apple Tree" (short story), a 1916 short story by John Galsworthy
AppleTree Markets, an American supermarket chain

See also

Apfelbaum, a German or Jewish surname meaning "apple tree"
Applebaum, a German or Jewish surname meaning "apple tree"
Jablonski, a Polish surname meaning "apple tree"
Jablonski, a Polish surname meaning "apple tree"
Malus, the genus of apple trees